The Bachelor UK 2011 was the fourth series of the reality television series The Bachelor, featuring Gavin Henson as "The Bachelor". The show was off-air for 6 years in the UK after the show previously aired on BBC Three, but was aired on Channel 5 between 19 August 2011 to 28 October 2011.

Production
Filming of the series took place over 2 months, in the south of France, Italy, the UK, with the final held in St. Lucia. The Batchelor was rugby player, Gavin Henson. In the 7th episode, Henson was required to visit the parents of the quarter finalists which meant that for one of the contestants, Zivile, he had to visit Vilnius, Lithuania.

Finalist Layla Manoochehri was previously notable for being the girlfriend of Simon Webbe, whom she broke up with in 2011, as well as for reaching the finals of the fifth season of The X Factor as a member of the group Girlband.

Contestants
The 25 contestants were as follows:

Morgan, glamour model from Derby
Nickie, single mum from Blackpool
Zivile, retail stylist from Vilnius
Chantelle, model from The Wirral
Keshia, PE student from Cheltenham
Angharad, beauty adviser from Cardiff
April, fashion designer from Hertfordshire
Georgie, cruise ship singer from Staffordshire
Carrie, beauty adviser from Devon
Bryony and Kathryn, property entrepreneur twins from London
Zena, web designer from Hertfordshire
Aaleeah, businesswoman from London
Natasha, travel consultant from London
Ola, fashion retailer from London
Laura, receptionist from The Wirral
Tia, promotional model from Derby
Laura Blair , dancer from London
Sammy, flight attendant from Essex
Tabby, model from London
Danielle, receptionist from Liverpool
Vikki, accountant manager from Dorking
Sammi, businesswoman from Kent
Carianne Barrow, model from Middlesex -Winner
Layla Manoochehri, songwriter from Essex

Quarter-final
Quarter-finalists were Layla, Carianne, Zivile, Morgan and April. The Bachelor visited the parents and family of the contestants.

Semi-final
Layla, Carianne and April were selected for the semi-final in St. Lucia. After dates with the three girls Gavin decided to let April go, leaving Carianne and Layla to battle it out for his affections.

Final
Layla and Carianne were the last two he shared romantic dates with. Although he said he had feelings for both the girls, he said that he loved Carianne and he chose her as his "girlfriend", telling her he loved her and she replied that she loved him also.

Carianne broke up with Henson in early 2012, describing him as "spineless" and "really dry" and saying the "whole experience was really fake".

Call-Out Order

 The contestant was eliminated at the rose ceremony
 The contestant was on a two-one-one date and received a rose prior to the rose ceremony
 Quit
 The contestant was on a one-on-one date and received at rose prior to the rose ceremony
 The contestant was on a two-on-one date and was eliminated
 The contestant was given a rose prior to the rose ceremony
 The contestant won the competition

Ratings
Episode Viewing figures from BARB.

References

External links

2011 British television seasons
UK 04